Justin Tyler Edwards (born December 16, 2003) is an American basketball player who currently attends Imhotep Institute Charter High School. He has committed to play at the University of Kentucky.

Early life and high school
Edwards grew up in Philadelphia, Pennsylvania and attends Imhotep Institute Charter High School. He helped Imhotep win the Philadelphia City championship as a sophomore. As a junior, Edwards averaged 18.3 points and 8.3 rebounds per game and led the Panthers to the PIAA Class 5A state championship. He played in the Nike Elite Youth Basketball League following the season. Edwards was selected to play in the 2023 McDonald's All-American Boys Game. He was also selected to play for Team USA in the Nike Hoops Summit.

Recruiting
Edwards is a consensus five-star recruit and one of the top players in the 2023 class, according to major recruiting services. He was rated as the #1 overall recruit in the nation by ESPN.com in January 2023. Edwards committed to play college basketball at Kentucky after considering offers from Tennessee, Auburn, Kansas, Maryland, and Villanova. He also considered playing professionally in the NBA G League.

Personal life
Edwards' mother, Ebony Twiggs, played college basketball at Cheyney University and overseas in Portugal.

References

External links
USA Basketball bio

Living people
American men's basketball players
Basketball players from Philadelphia
Small forwards
2003 births